Henri Klein (23 September 1919 – 12 May 2007) was a French middle-distance runner. He competed in the men's 1500 metres at the 1948 Summer Olympics.

References

External links
 

1919 births
2007 deaths
Sportspeople from Mulhouse
Athletes (track and field) at the 1948 Summer Olympics
French male middle-distance runners
Olympic athletes of France